Elena Lilik (née Apel, born 14 September 1998) is a German slalom canoeist who has competed at the international level since 2014. She is from Weimar, Germany but resides in Augsburg, home of the Augsburg Eiskanal. 

She won six medals at the ICF Canoe Slalom World Championships with two golds (C1: 2021, K1 team: 2022), three silvers (K1: 2021, Extreme: 2021, C1 team: 2022) and one bronze (K1: 2022).

Lilik has won four medals at the European Championships including two silver medals in the C1 team and K1 team events at the 2019 European Championships in Pau, France and two bronze medals in the C1 event at the 2018 and 2021 events. She also achieved success in her junior career, winning a silver medal in the K1 event 2015 Junior World Championships in Foz do Iguaçu. 

Her sister Emily Apel is also a slalom canoeist and her father Thomas Apel is a coach of the German national team.

Results

World Cup individual podiums

Complete World Cup results

References

External links

1998 births
Living people
German female canoeists
Medalists at the ICF Canoe Slalom World Championships
20th-century German women
21st-century German women